Ivankovci is a former Turkish village in the municipality of Veles, North Macedonia.

Demographics
According to the statistics of Bulgarian ethnographer Vasil Kanchov from 1900, 1200 inhabitants lived in Ivankovci, all Turks. On the 1927 ethnic map of Leonhard Schulze-Jena, the village is written as "Jovanli" and shown as a Turkish village. According to the 2002 census, the village had a total of 857 inhabitants. 685 were ethnic Macedonians and 172 were ethnic Serbs.

References

External links

Villages in Veles Municipality
Albanian communities in North Macedonia